Miloš Vidović (born 3 October 1989) is a Serbian professional footballer who plays for Radnički Kragujevac mainly as a defensive midfielder.

Club career 
Vidović started his career with FK Šumadija 1903 in his native Kragujevac, playing a season for the senior side before moving on to Olimpic Sarajevo in Bosnia and Herzegovina. He played for the club between 2009 and 2014, making 104 appearances and scoring 10 times. In January 2014, he was transferred to Croatian club RNK Split for three years.

On 27 June 2019, Vidović signed for FC Shakhter Karagandy.

References

External links 
 
 Footballdatabase.eu profile

1989 births
Living people
Sportspeople from Kragujevac
Association football midfielders
Serbian footballers
FK Olimpik players
RNK Split players
NK Slaven Belupo players
Croatian Football League players
Serbian expatriate footballers